Pierre Joubert may refer to:
Pierre Joubert (viticulturalist) (1664-1732), South African winemaker
Pierre Joubert (illustrator) (1910–2002), French illustrator and comics artist
Pierre Joubert (cricketer) (born 1978), South African cricketer